Battle Brook is a stream in the U.S. state of Minnesota.

Battle Brook was named for a falling out between workers of a local lumber company.

See also
List of rivers of Minnesota

References

Rivers of Sherburne County, Minnesota
Rivers of Mille Lacs County, Minnesota
Rivers of Benton County, Minnesota
Rivers of Minnesota